Fish Lake is an unincorporated community and census-designated place in Lincoln Township, LaPorte County, Indiana, United States. It is located where Indiana State Road 4 passes between Upper Fish Lake and Lower Fish Lake. These lakes feed the Kankakee River. As of the 2010 census, the population of the community was 1,016.

Geography
The community surrounds Lower Fish Lake and covers the north, west, and south sides of Upper Fish Lake. Mill Creek, the lakes' outlet, flows south to the Little Kankakee River and then shortly to the Kankakee River, a west-flowing waterway that is a primary tributary of the Illinois River.

Indiana State Road 4 passes through the community, between the two lakes, and leads northwest  to La Porte, the county seat, and southeast  to North Liberty.

Demographics

History

In 1888, Swift & Co. of Chicago (an ice company) purchased land around Upper and Lower Fish Lake. Ice harvesting ceased here in 1930.

Fish Lake is said to have had some homes owned by Al Capone when he was still running Chicago. His men chose this as one of their hideout locations. Since then, it has evolved into a small locals town. There still is a heavy Chicago tourist presence, many of whom own summer homes.

References

Census-designated places in LaPorte County, Indiana
Census-designated places in Indiana